La Voce is the ninth album by British tenor Russell Watson and his first resumption of a largely classical repertoire since overcoming brain cancer.

On 29 October 2010 Russell announced the release of his ninth album La Voce. The album was recorded in June 2010 with the Roma Sinfonietta in the historic studio Forum Music Village, produced by Mike Hedges and was released on 22 November 2010 on Epic Records, his first release on this label.

Track listing

Critical reception

La Voce was received extremely well by the Daily Express; garnering four stars.

Chart performance

Weekly charts

Year-end charts

Release history

References

Russell Watson albums
2010 albums
Classical crossover albums